Pontikonisi ("Mouse Island") is a Greek islet near the island of Corfu. Its prominent feature is a Byzantine chapel of Pantokrator, dating from the 11th or 12th century.

In Homer's The Odyssey, Poseidon turns the Phaiákian Cutter that brought Odysseus to Ithaka into stone. This segment of the Epic is believed to have been based on this Island off the coast of Corfu.

The island of Pontikonisi might have served as an inspiration for Arnold Böcklin's painting Isle of the Dead.

See also
Pondikonisi, an island off the coast of Crete
List of islands of Greece

References

Islands of the Ionian Islands (region)
Landforms of Corfu (regional unit)